The Consolante class frigate was a class of French warships during the Napoleonic Era. Each ship had a main battery consisting of 18-pounder long guns. The designers were François Pestel and Jacques-Noël Sané.

List of ships
Consolante
Builder: Saint Malo
Ordered: 
Launched: 22 July 1800 
Completed: 
Fate:

Piémontaise
Builder:  Saint Servan
Ordered: 
Launched: 15 November 1804
Completed: 
Fate:

Italienne
Builder: Saint Servan
Ordered: 
Launched: 15 August 1806
Completed: 
Fate:

Danae
Builder:  Genoa
Ordered: 
Launched: 18 August 1807
Completed: 
Fate:

Bellone
Builder: Saint Servan 
Ordered: 
Launched: February 1808
Completed: 
Fate:

Néréide
Builder: Saint Servan 
Ordered: 
Launched: December 1808
Completed: 
Fate:

Illyrienne
Builder: Saint Servan 
Ordered: 
Launched: 13 November 1811
Completed: 
Fate:

Galatée
Builder: Genoa 
Ordered: 
Launched: 5 May 1812
Completed: 
Fate:

References 

 Rif Winfield, British Warships in the Age of Sail, 1714-1792, Seaforth Publishing, 2008, .

 
Frigate classes